Yoram ( or  ?) is a given name derived from Jehoram, meaning "Jehovah is exalted" in Biblical Hebrew, which was the name of several individuals in the Tanakh; the female version of this name is Athaliah. Notable people with the name include:

Yoram Aridor (born 1933), former right-wing Israeli politician, Knesset member and minister
Yoram Barzel (born 1931), Israeli economist and a professor of economics at the University of Washington
Yoram Bauman (born 1973), American economist and stand-up comedian
Yoram Ben-Porat (died 1992), Israeli economist and president of the Hebrew University of Jerusalem
Yoram Chaiter (born 1964), physician, cancer researcher and bass singer
Yoram Danziger (born 1953), Justice of the Supreme Court of Israel, appointed to the Court in 2007
Yoram Dinstein (born 1936), Israeli President of Tel Aviv University
Yoram Dori (born 1950), strategic advisor to Shimon Peres when the latter was President of Israel
Yoram Globus (born 1941), Israeli director and producer, most famous for his association with Cannon Films Inc
Yoram Gross (born 1926), Australian producer of children's and family entertainment
Yoram Hazony (born 1964), Israeli scholar and founder of Shalem College in Jerusalem
Yoram Ish-Hurwitz (born 1968), Dutch pianist of Israeli origin
Yoram Kaniuk (born 1930), Israeli writer, painter, journalist, and theater critic
 Yoram Kochavy (born 1962), Israeli former Olympic swimmer
Yoram Marciano (born 1964), Israeli Labor politician
Yoram Moses, 1997 Gödel laureate and Associate Professor at the Technion - Israel Institute of Technology
Yoram Schweitzer ( 1980s onwards), senior research fellow at Israel's Institute for National Security Studies (INSS)

See also 
Jehoram (disambiguation)

Hebrew masculine given names